The Rural Municipality of Sarnia No. 221 is a rural municipality (RM) in the Canadian province of Saskatchewan within Census Division No. 6 and  Division No. 2. It is located in the south-central portion of the province.

History 
The RM of Sarnia No. 221 incorporated as a rural municipality on December 13, 1909.

Geography

Communities and localities 
The following urban municipalities are surrounded by the RM.

Villages
Chamberlain
Dilke
Holdfast

Resort villages
Alice Beach
Grandview Beach
Wee Too Beach

The following unincorporated communities are within the RM.

Organized hamlets
Sarnia Beach

Lakes and rivers
The following is a list of notable lakes and rivers in the RM:
Last Mountain Lake
Arm River

Parks
The following is a list of parks in the RM:
Arm River Recreation Site

Demographics 

Government 
The RM of Sarnia No. 221 is governed by an elected municipal council and an appointed administrator that meets on the second Wednesday of every month. The reeve of the RM is Carl Erlandson while its administrator is Patti Vance. The RM's office is located in Holdfast.

References 

 
Sarnia
Division No. 6, Saskatchewan